Daedalina is a monotypic moth genus of the family Noctuidae. Its only species, Daedalina clevia, is found in Suriname. Both the genus and species were first described by Heinrich Benno Möschler in 1880.

References

Acontiinae
Monotypic moth genera